Khlong Tan railway station is a railway station in Bang Kapi Subdistrict, Huai Khwang District, Bangkok.

Khlong Tan railway station is tucked away in a lane on the side of outbound Phetchaburi Road (portion New Phetchaburi) opposite Ekkamai Nuea Junction, where Ekkamai combines Phetchaburi Roads.

In the 1970s, the environment around the station retained a rural atmosphere. When passengers get off the train and walk out onto the main road, they must cross a wooden bridge across the ditch first.

Train services 
 Ordinary train No. 275/276 Bangkok – Aranyaprathet – Bangkok
 Ordinary train No. 277/278 Bangkok – Kabin Buri – Bangkok
 Ordinary train No. 279/280 Bangkok – Aranyaprathet – Bangkok
 Ordinary train No. 281/282 Bangkok – Kabin Buri – Bangkok
 Ordinary train No. 283/284 Bangkok – Ban Phlu Ta Luang – Bangkok
 Ordinary train No. 285/286 Bangkok – Chachoengsao Junction – Bangkok
 Ordinary train No. 367/368 Bangkok – Chachoengsao Junction – Bangkok
 Ordinary train No. 371/372 Bangkok – Prachin Buri – Bangkok
 Ordinary train No. 376/378 Rangsit – Hua Takhe – Bangkok
 Ordinary train No. 379/380 Bangkok – Hua Takhe – Bangkok
 Ordinary train No. 381/382 Bangkok – Chachoengsao Junction – Bangkok
 Ordinary train No. 383/388 Bangkok – Chachoengsao Junction – Bangkok
 Ordinary train No. 389/390 Bangkok – Chachoengsao Junction – Bangkok
 Ordinary train No. 391/384 Bangkok – Chachoengsao Junction – Bangkok

References 

 "ขึ้นเหนือ|ล่องใต้|ไปอีสาน|และตะวันออก" กำหนดเวลาเดินรถ เดือนมิถุนายน 2562 ("To north|down south|go Isan|and east"), Train Timetables June 2019  (Free pamphlet) 

Railway stations in Thailand